New Hudson may mean:
New Hudson (company), a former UK engineering and motorcycle manufacturing company
New Hudson, New York, the town located in Allegany County, New York
New Hudson, Michigan, an unincorporated community within Lyon Township, Oakland County, Michigan